Charles Christopher "Chuckin' Charlie" O'Rourke (May 10, 1917 – April 14, 2000) was an American football player and coach.  He played college football as a quarterback at Boston College and professionally with Chicago Bears of the National Football League (NFL) and the Los Angeles Dons and Baltimore Colts of the All-America Football Conference (AAFC).  O'Rourke quarterbacked the Boston College Eagles football team to one of its most famous wins.  His 24-yard run late in the fourth quarter gave the 1940 Eagles a 19–13 victory over Tennessee in the 1941 Sugar Bowl, staking BC's claim to a national championship.  O'Rourke served as the head football coach at University of Massachusetts Amherst (UMass) from 1952 to 1959, compiling a record of 21–39–4.  In 1972, he came the first Boston College player to be inducted into the College Football Hall of Fame.

Early life
Born in 1917, O'Rourke grew up in Malden, Massachusetts and played football at Malden High School.

Boston College
Although all of his records have been broken, O'Rourke was one of Boston College's first star quarterbacks. In three seasons, he completed 69 of 150 passes for 1,108 yards and 14 touchdowns.

1940 season
The 1940 team is perhaps the greatest football team in the history of Boston College. After the previous year's team earned the school's first appearance in a bowl game (Boston College lost to Clemson in the 1940 Cotton Bowl Classic) O'Rourke's running backs included veterans Frank Maznicki, Lou Montgomery (Boston College's first African-American football player), and team captain Henry Toczylowski. They were joined by a talented newcomer named Mike Holovak. The team also had wonderful receivers including Henry Woronicz, Gene Goodreault, Ed Zabilski, and Don Currivan. The team was undefeated outscoring its opponents 320–52 and held six teams scoreless. Boston College impressed the sports community by defeating Tulane 27–7 in the second week of the season and defeating Georgetown 19–18, snapping Georgetown's streak of twenty-two consecutive wins. On January 1, 1941, Boston College defeated Tennessee in the Sugar Bowl, 19–13. BC claims it won the national title in a three-way tie with Stanford and Minnesota, however the NCAA does not recognize Boston College as a national champion in that year.

Professional career
O'Rourke's professional career began in 1942 with the Chicago Bears. He saw limited playing time behind incumbent starter Sid Luckman, completing 37 of 88 passes for 951 yards, 11 touchdowns, and 16 interceptions. The 11 touchdowns set a new Bears rookie record which still stands. O'Rourke also intercepted three passes on defense, returned two punts, and made 23 punts for 817 yards for the 11–0 Bears. 

After three years in the Navy, O'Rourke returned to football in 1946 with the Los Angeles Dons of the All-America Football Conference (AAFC). In two seasons in Los Angeles he completed 194 of 354 passes for 2,699 yards, 25 touchdowns, and 30 interceptions. In 1948 he joined the AAFC's Baltimore Colts as a punter and back up quarterback behind Y. A. Tittle. In 1949, he played only five games before retiring and becoming an assistant coach for Baltimore until the team folded in 1950.

Coaching career
Aside from his two years as an NFL coach, O'Rourke was head football coach at University of Massachusetts Amherst (UMass) from 1952 to 1959. In seasons he compiled a 21–39–4 record with only one winning season (1952).

O'Rourke–McFadden Trophy
To honor the famed meeting between O'Rourke and Banks McFadden in the 1940 Cotton Bowl Classic, the O'Rourke–McFadden Trophy was introduced in 2008 and is awarded to the winner of the annual football game between Boston College and Clemson. The game is in-conference rivalry since Boston College joined the Atlantic Coast Conference (ACC) in 2005, and both teams play in the ACC's Atlantic Division.

Head coaching record

References

External links
 

1917 births
2000 deaths
American football quarterbacks
Canadian emigrants to the United States
Baltimore Colts (1947–1950) coaches
Baltimore Colts (1947–1950) players
Boston College Eagles football players
Chicago Bears players
Los Angeles Dons players
UMass Minutemen football coaches
College Football Hall of Fame inductees
Sportspeople from Brockton, Massachusetts
Sportspeople from Malden, Massachusetts
Sportspeople from Montreal
Coaches of American football from Massachusetts
Players of American football from Massachusetts
Gridiron football people from Quebec
Canadian players of American football